Amor Kehiha (born September 5, 1977) is a French-Algerian footballer who plays for Istres.

Personal
His younger brother Khaled Kehiha is also a professional footballer and is currently playing for FCA Calvi as well.

References

Amor Kehiha at Soccerway

Algerian footballers
FC Istres players
FC Martigues players
Clermont Foot players
SC Toulon players
SO Cassis Carnoux players
Gazélec Ajaccio players
Ligue 1 players
Ligue 2 players
French footballers
French sportspeople of Algerian descent
People from Martigues
1977 births
Living people
Association football midfielders
Sportspeople from Bouches-du-Rhône
Footballers from Provence-Alpes-Côte d'Azur